Gusti Wolf (11 April 1912 – 5 May 2007) was an Austrian stage, film, and television actress. 

Born in Vienna, Wolf was adopted by the painter, Felix Albrecht Harta who became her foster father.  Wolf made her stage debut at the Burgtheater in 1934 and from there moved on to Ostrava, Munich, and Berlin. In 1946, she was engaged at the Burgtheater again, whose Honorary Member she became in 1987.

She made her film debut in 1937, played mainly supporting roles in a number of UFA movies, and after the war continued her film career, playing alongside actors such as Hans Moser, Susi Nicoletti, Johannes Heesters, Marika Rökk, and Oskar Sima.

Her television credits include series such as Der alte Richter (1969–70), the Austrian cult classic, Kottan ermittelt (1981–83), the comedy series, Wenn das die Nachbarn wüßten (1990–92), and guest roles in Derrick, Tatort, and Kommissar Rex.

Wolf never married, and didn't have any children. She lived in Vienna.

Selected filmography
 Little County Court (1938)
 Falstaff in Vienna (1940)
 Orient Express (1944)
 Bonus on Death (1950)
 When a Woman Loves (1950)
 Shame on You, Brigitte! (1952)
 The Divorcée (1953)
 Daughter of the Regiment (1953)
 Rose-Girl Resli (1954)
 Das Riesenrad (1961)
 The Model Boy (1963)
Derrick - Season 2, Episode 8: "Pfandhaus" (1975)

Decorations and awards
 1934: 2nd Prize - Silver medal at the Vienna International Film Festival
 1966: Kammerschauspielerin
 1972: Burgtheater ring
 1977: Austrian Cross of Honour for Science and Art, 1st class
 1981: Special cup for 35 years of membership at the Burgtheater
 1984: Gold pendant with engraving for 40 years Burgtheater
 1985: Grand Decoration of Honour for Services to the Republic of Austria
 1987: Honorary Member of the Burgtheater
 1992: Nestroy Ring
 1992: Film Award Rose Hill
 1993: Golden Romy as the most popular actress
 1997: Golden Medal of Honour for Services to the City of Vienna
 2000: Appointment as Professor
 2001: Golden Rathausmann
 2003: Nestroy Theatre Prize for lifetime achievement

External links
 
 Image

1912 births
2007 deaths
Austrian film actresses
Actresses from Vienna
Recipients of the Austrian Cross of Honour for Science and Art, 1st class
Recipients of the Grand Decoration for Services to the Republic of Austria
Recipients of the Romy (TV award)
Austrian stage actresses
Austrian television actresses
20th-century Austrian actresses